Robin Sebastian is a British actor, best known for his portrayals of Kenneth Williams. A native of London, he has played Williams in recreations of Round the Horne and Hancock's Half Hour on stage, screen and radio.

Personal life
Raised in Headley, Surrey, Sebastian was educated at Highfield Prep School in Liphook, the King's School, Canterbury, Manchester University (reading History of Art) and the Arts Educational Schools Acting Company. He lives with his wife Lucy in West London.

Theatre credits
as Kenneth Williams in The Missing Hancocks, Assembly Rooms Edinburgh
as Willy Bambury in Fallen Angels, UK tour
as Robin Craigie in Volcano, Vaudeville Theatre London and UK tour
as Kenneth Williams in Stop Messing About, Leicester Square Theatre London and UK tour
as Kenneth Williams in Round The Horne - Unseen and Uncut, Theatre Royal Brighton and UK tour
as Lt Gruber in 'Allo 'Allo, UK tour
as Carmen Ghia in The Producers, UK tour and West End
as Cardinal Richelieu in The Three Musketeers, Bristol Old Vic
as Willy Bambury in Fallen Angels, Vienna's English Theatre
as Kenneth Williams in Round the Horne ... Revisited, West End and UK tour
as Cecil Graham in Lady Windermere's Fan, Vienna's English Theatre
as Algernon in The Importance of Being Earnest, Torch Theatre Milford Haven

Radio credits
as Kenneth Williams in The Missing Hancocks, Radio 4
as Kenneth Williams in Twice Ken is Plenty, Radio 4

TV credits
as Kenneth Williams in The Lost Sitcoms: Hancock's Half Hour, BBC4
as James Ferman in Holy Flying Circus, Hillbilly Productions, BBC4
as jewellery clerk in Catastrophe, Avalon Productions, Channel 4 
as arrogant husband in Sherlock Series 2, Hartswood, BBC1
as Kenneth Williams in Round the Horne ... Revisited, FictionLab, BBC4
as Narrator in Yours Faithfully Edna Welthorpe (Mrs) Polkadot Productions, University Of Leicester

External links

References

Living people
English male film actors
English male stage actors
English male television actors
Male actors from London
1965 births
People from Mole Valley (district)